Geoffrey Ian Allott (born 24 December 1971) is a former New Zealand cricketer who played in 10 Tests and 31 One Day Internationals (ODIs) from 1996 to 2000. He retired from all cricket in 2001, following series of injuries

International career
Allott was a member of the New Zealand squad that won a bronze medal at the 1998 Commonwealth Games, which was the only time cricket was included in Commonwealth games. Allott was a revelation at the 1999 Cricket World Cup in England May/June 1999. With 20 wickets in nine matches he topped the wicket taking ranks for the tournament. Gaining prodigious movement in the air and off the pitch, the left-armer deceived some of the world's best batsmen, and made a huge contribution towards New Zealand's semi-final finish.

He was first selected by Glenn Turner for the Test series against Zimbabwe in 1995/6, when New Zealand had an injury crisis and were looking to give Test experience to new players of quality. Although he was moderately successful he was not selected for the subsequent ODI series or for the 1996 Cricket World Cup. A quick left armer in the Richard Collinge "dig it in" mould he was considered too inaccurate for limited overs. Over the winter he built up his strength and bowled well for his province at the start of 1996/7. A great game for New Zealand A versus England in 1997 earned him a recall to the Test team, and he bowled far better in two Tests than his figures might indicate.

Trivia
He held the record for the longest time taken to score a duck in Test cricket as well as taking a long time to get off the mark, but was dismissed for duck – 77 balls and 101 minutes for New Zealand versus South Africa in 1999. Though his record for longest time for a duck still stands, his record for longest time for no runs was held until March 2013, when England cricketer Stuart Broad batted for 103 minutes against New Zealand before scoring a run.

References

1971 births
Living people
Canterbury cricketers
New Zealand One Day International cricketers
New Zealand Test cricketers
New Zealand cricketers
Cricketers at the 1998 Commonwealth Games
Commonwealth Games bronze medallists for New Zealand
Commonwealth Games medallists in cricket
Medallists at the 1998 Commonwealth Games